The 2011 Trophée des Alpilles was a professional tennis tournament played on hard courts. It was the third edition of the tournament which was part of the 2011 ATP Challenger Tour. It took place in Saint-Rémy-de-Provence, France between 5 and 11 September 2011.

ATP entrants

Seeds

 1 Rankings are as of August 29, 2011.

Other entrants
The following players received wildcards into the singles main draw:
  Pierre-Hugues Herbert
  Jonathan Hilaire
  Julien Obry
  Nicolas Renavand

The following players received entry as an alternate into the singles main draw:
  Josselin Ouanna

The following players received entry from the qualifying draw:
  Antoine Escoffier
  Sami Reinwein
  David Rice
  Élie Rousset

Champions

Singles

 Édouard Roger-Vasselin def.  Arnaud Clément, 6–4, 6–3

Doubles

 Pierre-Hugues Herbert /  Édouard Roger-Vasselin def.  Arnaud Clément /  Nicolas Renavand, 6–0, 4–6, [10–7]

External links
Official Website
ITF Search
ATP official site

2011 ATP Challenger Tour
Trophée des Alpilles
2011 in French tennis